is a women's football club playing in Japan's football league, Chugoku League. Its hometown is the city of Izumo.

Current squad

Results

Ground

References

External links 
 official site
 Japanese Club Teams

Women's football clubs in Japan
Association football clubs established in 1991
1991 establishments in Japan
Sport in Shimane Prefecture